Naga Prok attitude, translated as "sheltered-by-the-naga Buddha", is an attitude of Buddha in Burmese, Khmer, Lao and Thai art in which the Buddha, seated in either the meditation or maravijaya attitude, is sheltered by or covered with a multi-headed nāga. The nāga, whose name is Mucalinda, usually has seven or nine heads and appeared to coil the base of the Buddha statue.

The attitude references an episode in the Buddha's life after reaching the enlightenment. He travelled to various kingdoms to teach and spent the rest of his time meditating. One night, a heavy storm raged in the forest where he was meditating. A nāga by the name of Mucalinda saw him meditating under harsh weather. Mucalinda decided to coil around his āsana (seat) and use himself as a shield to protect the Buddha from raindrops.

The attitude was pioneered in early Khmer art.

Gallery

References 

 translated from :th:ปางนาคปรก on Thai Wikipedia

Buddhist art
Buddhist iconography
Laotian art
Thai Buddhist art and architecture
Buddhism in Laos
Cultural depictions of Gautama Buddha